The Hertsa or Hertza is a right tributary of the river Prut in Romania and Ukraine. It flows through the town Hertsa, and discharges into the Prut near Marshyntsi.

References

Rivers of Romania
Rivers of Chernivtsi Oblast
Rivers of Botoșani County
Tributaries of the Prut